Mike Oquaye Jnr is a Ghanaian politician and diplomat. He is a member of the New Patriotic Party of Ghana. He is currently Ghana's High Commissioner to India.

Diplomatic appointment 

In July 2017, President Nana Akuffo-Addo named Mike Oquaye Jnr as Ghana's High Commissioner to India. He was among twenty two other distinguished Ghanaians who were named to head various diplomatic Ghanaian missions in the world.

References

Year of birth missing (living people)
Living people
High Commissioners of Ghana to India
New Patriotic Party politicians
Presbyterian Boys' Senior High School alumni
Ga-Adangbe people
Ghanaian Protestants